The northern beaked gecko (Rhynchoedura sexapora) is a gecko endemic to Australia.

References

Rhynchoedura
Geckos of Australia
Reptiles described in 2011
Taxa named by Mitzy Pepper
Taxa named by Paul Doughty
Taxa named by Mark Norman Hutchinson
Taxa named by J. Scott Keogh